Luis Villavicencio (born 3 February 1950) is a Guatemalan footballer. He competed at the 1968 Summer Olympics and the 1976 Summer Olympics.

References

External links
 

1950 births
Living people
Guatemalan footballers
Guatemala international footballers
Olympic footballers of Guatemala
Footballers at the 1968 Summer Olympics
Footballers at the 1976 Summer Olympics
Sportspeople from Guatemala City
Comunicaciones F.C. players
Association football defenders